Rhön-Grabfeld is a Landkreis (district) in Bavaria, Germany. It is bounded by (from the southeast and clockwise) the districts of Hassberge, Schweinfurt and Bad Kissingen, and the states of Hesse (district Fulda) and Thuringia (districts Schmalkalden-Meiningen and Hildburghausen).

History
In medieval times the region was a part of the Bishopric of Würzburg. When the clerical states of Germany were dissolved in 1803, it fell to Bavaria. The district of Rhön-Grabfeld was established in 1972, when the former districts of Bad Neustadt, Königshofen and Mellrichstadt were merged.

Geography
The district consists of two distinct areas: The eastern parts of the Rhön mountains and the Bavarian portion of Grabfeld.

Grabfeld is a fertile region south of the Rhön mountains. Literally it means "digfield". According to local legend a queen once lost her beloved ring in the Grabfeld. She ordered her servants to dig up the whole area. When the ring was found, she was relieved and ordered a royal estate to be built where it was found. Later this estate became the city of Königshofen.

The source of the Fränkische Saale is located in the district. The river runs through the district from north to south.

Coat of arms
The coat of arms displays:
 a crown representing the Grabfeld legend
 a wavy line representing the Saale River
 three summit crosses representing the mountains of the Rhön

Towns and municipalities

References

External links

 Official website (German)

 
Districts of Bavaria
Rhön Mountains